Catarrh, South Carolina, United States is an unincorporated community in western Chesterfield County. Jefferson is 6 miles NNW and McBee is 9.2 miles SE. Catarrh appears on the Angelus, South Carolina Geological Survey Map. Catarrh falls within the Jefferson, South Carolina zip code 29718.

References

Unincorporated communities in Chesterfield County, South Carolina
Unincorporated communities in South Carolina